Marco Crespi (born June 2, 1962) is an Italian professional basketball coach. He served as a Head Coach of Baskonia and Scaligera Verona of the Italian League. He ended hos career 2021 as Head Coach for Sweden women's national basketball team.

Coaching career
Crespi became the head coach of the Italian League club Mens Sana Basket Siena in 2013.

NBA scouting career
Crespi has worked as the director of international scouting for NBA clubs like the Boston Celtics and the Phoenix Suns.

Awards and accomplishments
 2× Italian 2nd Division Champion: (2001, 2011)
 Italian Super Cup Winner: (2013)

References

External links
 Euroleague.net Coaching Profile
 Italian League Coaching Profile 
 Spanish League Profile 
 

1962 births
Living people
A.S. Junior Pallacanestro Casale coaches
Italian basketball coaches
Mens Sana Basket coaches
Olimpia Milano coaches
Pallacanestro Biella coaches
Saski Baskonia coaches
Scaligera Basket Verona coaches
Victoria Libertas Pesaro coaches
Liga ACB head coaches